Stephen Chapman Townesend (1860 – May 1914) F.R.C.S. was an English surgeon, stage actor, anti-vivisectionist and writer.

Townesend was educated at St Bartholomew's Hospital and the University of Edinburgh. He qualified M.R.C.S. in 1883 and F.R.C.S. in 1887. He was surgeon on the Orient Steamship Company's line, house surgeon at St Mark's Hospital and at Birmingham General Hospital. Townesend was a stage actor under the name Will Dennis and assisted the Amateur Dramatic Society of St Bartholomew's Hospital.

In 1900, he married Frances Hodgson Burnett in Genoa. He was involved with the stage adaptations of her novels. They divorced two years later. Townesend was an anti-vivisectionist who was described as loving animals more than people.

Townesend died in Colney Heath from pneumonia in May 1914.

Selected publications

A Thorough-Bred Mongrel: The Tale of a Dog, Told by a Dog to Lovers of Dogs (1900)
Dr. Tuppy (1912)

Notes

References

1860 births
1914 deaths
19th-century English male actors
Alumni of the University of Edinburgh Medical School
English male stage actors
19th-century English medical doctors
Anti-vivisectionists
Deaths from pneumonia in England
English surgeons